Gholam Reza or Gholamreza is a male Muslim given name and may refer to:

People
Gholamreza Khan Arkawazi (1770–1839), Kurdish poet
Gholamreza Rashid Yasemi (1895–1951), Iranian poet and translator
Gholamreza Rouhani (1897–1985), Iranian humorous poet
Gholam Reza Azhari (1917–2001), military leader and Prime Minister of Iran
Gholamreza Pahlavi (1923–2017), Iranian prince of the Pahlavi dynasty
Gholamreza Hassani (1927–2018), Iranian conservative imam
Gholamreza Takhti (1930–1968), Iranian Olympic Gold-Medalist wrestler
Gholam Reza Aghazadeh (born 1949), Iranian politician
Gholamreza Naalchegar or Reza Naalchegar (born 1958), Iranian footballer
Gholamreza Enayati or Reza Enayati (born 1976), Iranian footballer
Gholamreza Rezaei (born 1984), Iranian footballer
Gholamreza Nikpey (1927–1979), executed Iranian politician
Gholamreza Rezvani (?–2013), Iranian Ayatollah
Gholam Reza Afkhami, Iranian politician anad historian, now resideant in USA
Gholamreza Ansari (born 1955), Iranian diplomat
Gholamreza Ansari (born 1956), Iranian politician
Gholam-Reza Pourmand, Iranian urologist
Gholam Reza Sinambari, Iranian engineer
Gholamreza Fathabadi, Iranian footballer
Gholamreza Khosravi Savadjani (?–2014), executed political prisoner
Gholamreza Khosroo Kurdieh (1965–1997), Iranian serial killer and rapist

Places in Iran
Tolombeh-ye Gholam Reza Mohammadi, a village in Kerman Province
Mowtowr-e Gholam Reza Azadi, a village in Kerman Province
Hajji Gholamreza, a village in North Khorasan Province
Gholamreza, Khuzestan, a village in Khuzestan Province
Chichali Gholamreza, a village in Khuzestan Province